Andrés Cano is an American politician who currently serves as the House Minority Leader in the Arizona House of Representatives. Cano is in his third term, having represented District 20 (Tucson) since 2023. He previously represented District 3 from 2019 to 2023. Cano is a Member of the Democratic Party.

Education
Cano earned his bachelor's degree (B.A.) in broadcast journalism from Arizona State University in 2014. He graduated cum laude from the Walter Cronkite School of Journalism, becoming the first person in his family to graduate from college.

While in college, Cano completed congressional internships in the offices of U.S. Senator Mark Udall and U.S. Congressman Ed Pastor.

In 2019, Cano completed Harvard University's John F. Kennedy School of Government program for Senior Executives in State and Local Government as a David Bohnett LGBTQ Victory Institute Leadership Fellow.

Early Life & Career

Cano was born at Tucson Medical Center in Tucson, Arizona on May 14, 1992. He was raised by a single mom in Section 8 housing. 

As a teenager, Cano worked three consecutive summers as a Summer Youth Employment Program intern with Pima County.

In 2012, Cano began working as a senior aide to Pima County District 5 Supervisor Richard Elías. Cano oversaw the office's constituent relations and community outreach.

In 2016, Cano was named an inaugural fellow of the Human Rights Campaign's HIV360 Fellowship Program as part of his work to reduce HIV transmission among Latinos in Southern Arizona.

In July 2020, the Community Foundation for Southern Arizona announced that it had hired Cano to lead the LGBTQ+ Alliance Fund as its first Director. In its announcement, the Fund said the following about Cano's hiring: "As we further our footprint as a philanthropic agent of change, Andrés’ ability to bring people together and build community will take us far in our second decade of supporting our LBGTQ+ sisters and brothers,” said Karin Uhlich, Chair of the LGBTQ+ Alliance Fund Advisory Board."

Political career & community involvement
In 2010, Cano was elected president of the Young Democrats of Arizona.

In 2014, Cano was elected as Chair of the Legislative District 3 Democratic Committee.

On August 28, 2017, Cano announced his candidacy for the Arizona House of Representatives in a video posted on social media. 

Cano has served as volunteer board member with numerous organizations, including Planned Parenthood Arizona, Literacy Connects, Pan Left Productions, and the Rural Community Assistance Corporation.

Awards & Recognition
In 2016, Cano was named an inaugural fellow of the Human Rights Campaign's HIV360 Fellowship Program as part of his work to reduce HIV transmission among Latinos in Southern Arizona.

In 2016, Cano was named the Center for the Future of Arizona's 'Emerging Leader,' becoming the organization's youngest—and first Latino—award recipient.

In 2020, Cano was awarded the Congressional Hispanic Caucus Institute's Young Alumnus of the Year Award.

Elections

Cano was the top vote-getter in the August 28, 2018, Democratic primary election, paving the path for his nomination as a candidate for one of two open seats in the November general election.

In 2020, Cano successfully ran for a second-term. He was re-elected to his third term in November 2022.

Arizona House of Representatives

In the 56th legislature, Cano serves as the Ranking Democrat on the House Ways and Means Committee; a committee assignment that he has maintained since his first term in 2019.

Prior to becoming Democratic Leader in January 2023, Cano served as the Ranking Democrat on the Natural Resources, Energy, and Water Committee in the 55th legislature.

As a legislator, Cano has introduced legislation to restore funding to the state's community colleges.  In 2022, Cano helped negotiate a historic bipartisan bill to conserve the state's water resources.

References

External links
 

1992 births
21st-century American politicians
21st-century American LGBT people
Democratic Party members of the Arizona House of Representatives
Gay politicians
Hispanic and Latino American state legislators in Arizona
LGBT Hispanic and Latino American people
LGBT state legislators in Arizona
Living people
People from Tucson, Arizona